Fighter Squadron 194 (VF-194) was an aviation unit of the United States Navy. It was originally established as VF-91 on 26 March 1952, redesignated VF-194 on 1 August 1963 and disestablished on 1 March 1978. It was the third US Navy squadron to be designated VF-194.

Squadron lineage
The US Navy does not recognize the tradition of squadrons once they have been disestablished. Therefore, even if there is a squadron with the same designation and nickname, it is officially a totally new squadron. Four different squadrons have been designated VF-194 since 1948, VF-194 Main Battery (1950–1955), VF-194 Yellow Devils (1955–1958), VF-194 Red Lightnings (1952–1978) and VF-194 Red Lightnings (1986–8), this page is focussed on the third VF-194.

Operational history
VF-91 was established on 26 March 1952 and equipped with the Grumman F9F-2 Panther.

In 1954 the squadron exchanged their Panthers for the swept wing Grumman F9F-6 Cougar. Between 11 May 1954 and 12 December 1954 VF-91 circumnavigated the world aboard .

The F9F-8s were replaced by the North American FJ-3 Fury in 1957 and the squadron made a Western Pacific cruise aboard  between September 1957 and April 1958.

In 1959 VF-91 transitioned to the Vought F-8C Crusader and made three deployments aboard  between 1960 and 1963.

On 1 August 1963 VF-91 was redesignated VF-194 and reassigned to Carrier Air Wing Nineteen. Between 1964 and 1973 VF-194 made eight deployments to the Vietnam War, two aboard  (1964, 1965/66), two aboard  (1966/67, 1967/68) and the last four aboard . During these deployments the squadron flew the F-8E from 1965 to 1968 and then the F-8J. After the end of the US involvement in Vietnam in 1973, VF-194 made another two cruises to the Western Pacific aboard Oriskany. VF-194 and its sister squadron VF-191 were the last US Navy fighter squadrons equipped with the F-8 Crusader.

When USS Oriskany was retired as the last active , VF-194 received the McDonnell Douglas F-4J Phantom in 1976. Together with VF-191 the squadron was reassigned to Carrier Air Wing Fifteen. However, after only one deployment aboard  the squadron was disestablished on 1 March 1978.

Gallery

See also
 History of the United States Navy
 List of inactive United States Navy aircraft squadrons
 List of United States Navy aircraft squadrons

References

 military.com: VF-194 : Fighter Squadron 194

Strike fighter squadrons of the United States Navy